Romualdas Murauskas (2 October 1934 in Kaunas, Lithuania – 23 May 1979) was a boxer from the Soviet Union. He competed for the USSR in the 1956 Summer Olympics held in Melbourne, Australia in the light-heavyweight event where he finished in third place.

References
 Sports-reference

1934 births
1979 deaths
Lithuanian male boxers
Olympic boxers of the Soviet Union
Olympic bronze medalists for the Soviet Union
Boxers at the 1956 Summer Olympics
Sportspeople from Kaunas
Olympic medalists in boxing
Soviet male boxers
Medalists at the 1956 Summer Olympics
Light-heavyweight boxers